The Majapahit flag and emblem refers to the royal colors and symbols used to represent the Majapahit empire. However, the nature of how the colors and the symbols were used and represented is still a subject of study and disagreement among historians.

The red-and-white color combination is flown by the Indonesian Navy in the Republic of Indonesia Ship (KRI) as naval jack and pennon, with the name "Lencana Perang" and "Ular-Ular Perang" respectively.

History 
The red and white banner is recorded in the Kudadu inscription dated 1294 AD. In the inscription it is said that the red and white banners were flown by Jayakatwang troops from Daha who were chasing Raden Wijaya's troops. The Red and White Charter is another name for the Kudadu inscription. It was stated that Raden Wijaya was being chased by Jayakatwang's troops carrying the flag, when suddenly "the enemy's banner was seen east of Haniruh, the colors were red and white" (hana ta tuṅgulniṁ atru layū-layū katon·vetani hañiru[h], bāṁ lāvan putiḥ varṇnanya). This is found on the 3rd line of Kudadu 4v inscription.

When King Hayam Wuruk made a visit to the whole country of Majapahit, the red and white color was noted to be used as a sign of the entourage. Recorded in Nagarakretagama canto 18 stanza 2–4:

Stanza 2

 
 
 
 

Stanza 3

 
 
 
 

Stanza 4

 
 
 
 

Translations:
Stanza  2

 Although numberless, yet the carts had means to be counted, namely by their different marks.
 Naturally the tour of those (carts) went in groups; those drawings (on their sides) were not the same from one mantri to another.
 The rakryan (Right Honourable) the honoured mantri-principal, the prime-minister of Majapahit, is the honoured mediator of the Royal Family.
 Even as many as four hundred carts; pupulutan was their mark, in great numbers.

Stanza 3

 The honoured Illustrious Protector of Pajang, the great number of Her wagons alike had the mark of the handiwa (sugar-palm), glorious.
 Then, the Illustrious Protector of Lasem, crowded were Her wagons, with drawings: a white bull, splendid.
 The honoured IIlustrious Protector of Daha had for marks: sadak (betel leaves) with flowers; the carts were glittering with drawings of gold.
 The principal is the IIlustrious Jiwana-monarch, with cars all alike having for mark: lobheng lewih figures, crowded.

Stanza 4

 Then the honoured Illustrious Tikta Wilwa (Majapahit) Prabhu, His cars were numberless, their marks were wilwas (maja / bael fruit).
 Of gringsing, lobheng-lewih, laka, alike drawn in gold, were their kajangs (screens), with ornaments.
 All kinds of punggawas (superior serving-men) conveyed the bini­ hajis (ladies of the keputren), and also the Mistress the IlIustrious Sudewi.
 All the followers' wives, those cars were open, the vanguard of the whole group.

From the translation, the colors and emblems used by Majapahit can be classified as follows:

Red and white color are used as the colors of the kajang—meaning the side curtains or the semi-cylindrical roof of the carriages, made of palm leaves tacked together or plaited. The red-white combination is considered the most noble.

Lobheng lewih is the name of an ornate motif for a painting, drawing, or textile. This motif is colored red and white, the combination is called gula-kalapa, which is the opposite of pare-anom, namely the green and gold colors, which Daha uses. The combination of red and white is considered the most exalted in Java.

Gringsing is also the name of a decorative motif, especially for weaving and batik. It was probably white and black-colored, spotted, or dotted.

In Nagarakretagama canto 84 stanza 4 also mentioned banners (Old Javanese: dwaja atau dhwaja). The color is not stated, Pigeaud argues that such banners have a symbolic color, with red-white (gula-klapa) be the most sublime combination.

Sukarno depicted the maritime banner of Majapahit with alternating red and white lines, called it Sang Getih-Getah (The Red-and-White).

State emblem 
The state emblem of Majapahit (rajasa lancana) is mentioned in Nagarakretagama canto 18 stanza 4. It is noted that when King Hayam Wuruk went to Lumajang, the king's chariot had a cihna, which means identification mark. Its symbol is the wilwa (Sanskrit for maja / bael fruit—Aegle marmelos). The round shape of the maja fruit was probably associated with the position of the king and capital of Majapahit as the center of the Majapahit mandala.

Notes

Other flags 
Flags with similar design:

See also 
 Surya Majapahit
 Flag of Indonesia

References

Bibliography 

 
 
 
 
 
 
 
 
 

Obsolete national flags
History of flags
Maritime flags